Electrostrymon joya, the muted hairstreak, is a butterfly of the family Lycaenidae. It was described by Paul Dognin in 1895. It is found from southern Texas and Mexico to Ecuador, Peru and Tobago, as well as on the Netherlands Antilles. The habitat consists of openings and edges in tropical semideciduous river forests and second growth.

The wingspan is 24–30 mm. The upperside of the males is orange brown and the underside is tan with a red postmedian line. Females are identical to Electrostrymon hugon. Adults are on wing from April to January in the tropics. There are three or more generations per year. They feed on flower nectar.

The larvae feed on the flowers of Mangifera indica and Psiguria racemosa.

References

External links
Butterflies of the Americas images

Eumaeini
Butterflies of Central America
Butterflies of the Caribbean
Butterflies of North America
Lycaenidae of South America
Butterflies described in 1895
Taxa named by Paul Dognin